Darwinia luehmannii is a flowering plant in the myrtle family Myrtaceae and is endemic to Western Australia.

Flowering occurs between May and November producing white and green flowers. Often found in flat depressions or at the bases of rocks near Esperance where it grows in sandy loamy soils. 

This darwinia was first formally described 1896  by Ferdinand von Mueller and Ralph Tate and the description was published in Transactions, proceedings and report, Royal Society of South Australia. The specific epithet (luehmannii) is in honour of Johann Georg Luehmann.

References

luehmannii
Endemic flora of Western Australia
Vulnerable flora of Australia
Myrtales of Australia
Rosids of Western Australia
Plants described in 1896
Taxa named by Ferdinand von Mueller